Amderminsky district was a former district (raion) of the Nenets National Okrug in the former RSFSR of the Soviet Union. It existed from 1940 to 1959.

Location 

Amderminsky district was located at the east end of the Nenets Autonomous Okrug. The district's area was 64,300 km2. The administrative centre was the town of Amderma.

History 

The district was formed on 11 July 1940 from part of the Bolshezemelsky district, containing three selsoviets:

 Vaygach Island selsoviet
 Karsky selsoviet
 Yushar selsoviet

In 1959, Amderminsky district was abolished along with all other districts in the Nenets AO, and became a direct subordination. Today, it is a part of Zapolyarny district, which is the only district in Nenets AO.

Media 

A newspaper company, called Polyarnaya Zvezda (Polar Miner), published newspapers in Amderma and the Anderminsky district from 1937 until the district was abolished.

References 

Nenets Autonomous Okrug